The Special Constables Act 1838 was an Act of the Parliament of the United Kingdom.

Summary description

Preamble

The Act dealt with financial matters connected with the appointment and payment of the aforesaid constables; it provided for the companies employing the labourers and others to bear the cost of the constables and also limited any such claims which were deemed to be unreasonable.

Repeal
The Act was repealed by the Statute Law Revision (No.2) Act 1874 (37 & 38 Vict. c.96.).

Sources
Special Constables Act 1838

1838 in British law
United Kingdom Acts of Parliament 1838
Railway Acts
Repealed United Kingdom Acts of Parliament
Police legislation in the United Kingdom